Schinia verna, or the Verna's flower moth, is a moth of the family Noctuidae. It is found in Alberta, Saskatchewan and Manitoba.

The wingspan is approximately 20 mm.

The larvae feed on Antennaria species.

References

Schinia
Moths of North America
Moths described in 1983